Malmö Municipality, or City of Malmö (Malmö stad), is a Swedish municipality in Skåne County, the southernmost of the counties of Sweden (and conterminous with the historical province (landskap) of Scania). 

When the first Swedish local government acts were implemented in 1863, the Old City of Malmö was made one of the country's 88 city municipalities and the first city council was elected. The municipal territory has been augmented through mergers in 1911, 1915, 1931, 1935, 1952, 1967 and finally in 1971.

In 1971, the city was also converted into a municipality of unitary type, like all others in Sweden. Malmö Municipality, however, styles itself Malmö stad (City of Malmö) in all cases when it is legally possible. This is a decision taken by the municipal assembly. It is purely nominal and has no effect on the legal status of the municipality.

Geography

Localities
As of 2015, there were six urban areas ( or locality) and six smaller settlements in the municipality.

The localities are listed in the table according to the size of the population in 2018. Note that a small part of Malmö (Arlöv) is situated in Burlöv Municipality.

City districts

After a reform on 1 July 2013, Malmö Municipality is divided into five city districts. They manage public kindergartens, schools, and geriatric care within their geographical areas, and provide funds for local cultural and recreational activities.

There are 136 neighbourhoods.

Before the reform in July 2013, Malmö Municipality was divided into ten city districts after the 1996 City District Reform.

Local government
The municipal legislative body of the municipality is the 61-member municipal assembly (kommunfullmäktige), elected by proportional representation for a four-year term. The assembly appoints the municipality's main governing bodies, the 11-member executive committee (kommunstyrelsen) and the 8 governing commissioners. The executive committee and the commissioners are headed by a municipal commissioner (kommunstyrelsens ordförande) or "mayor". The mayor is Katrin Stjernfeldt Jammeh of the Social Democratic Party.

There are seven political parties represented in the council elected in 2022: Social Democratic Party (20 seats), Moderate Party (13), Sweden Democrats (10), Left Party (9), Liberals (3), Green Party (4) and Centre Party (2).

International cooperation

Twin towns — Sister cities
, Malmö has town twinning treaties or treaties of co-operation signed with 11 cities. Of these, cooperation is closest with Newcastle and Tallinn. The complete list of cities is the following (twinning year in parenthesis):

See also
 Metropolitan Malmö

References

External links

 Malmö stad - official website
 Malmostadwebbvideo - official YouTube channel

 
Municipalities of Skåne County